Con-way Freight was a less-than-truckload (LTL) motor carrier headquartered in Ann Arbor utilizing a network of freight service centers to provide regional, inter-regional and transcontinental less-than-truckload freight services throughout North America. The business unit provided day-definite delivery service to manufacturing, industrial and retail customers. Con-way Freight was the largest division of Con-way, Inc. with 16,600 employees, more than 365 operating locations, 16,000 dock doors and 32,750 tractors and trailers. The company was founded by Consolidated Freightways (CF) of Portland, Oregon as a non union spinoff, for less than truckload hauling. In 2009 Con-way Freight reported revenues of over $2.6 billion.  Con-way Inc., including Con-way Freight and sibling company Con-way Truckload, was acquired by XPO Logistics, a primarily non-asset logistics company from Greenwich, Connecticut, in a deal worth $3.5 billion.

History
Con-way Freight originated in May 1983 with the launch of Con-way Western Express, with 11 service centers in three western states, followed one month later by the start of Con-way Central Express, with 11 locations in seven Midwest states.

Con-way was created to provide nonunion, regional short-haul service in markets where CF wasn’t actively selling its services. The regional companies Con-way Southern Express (CSE), Con-way Central Express (CCX), Con-way Western Express (CWX) and Con-way Eastern Express (CEX) were established as part of this strategy.
On their first day of business the two carriers — which collectively began with 230 employees and 334 trucks, tractors and trailers handled 113 shipments.

On October 31, 2015, XPO Logistics, Headquartered in Greenwich, CT acquired Con-way Freight.

On September 9, 2015 Con-way Inc. was acquired by CEO Bradley Jacobs of XPO Logistics, Inc. Roughly a year later, on October 27, 2016, XPO completed the sale of Con-way Truckload, its recently acquired full-truckload division (3,000 tractors, 7,500 trailers, and 29 locations) from Con-way Freight to the Canadian based TFI International for $558 million in cash. By May 2017, XPO reported that it had completed rebranding of Con-way to XPO Logistics effectively marking the retirement of the brand.

Operations
LTL carriers transport freight from multiple shippers utilizing a network of freight service centers, combined with a fleet of linehaul and pickup-and-delivery tractors and trailers. Freight is picked up from customers and consolidated for shipment at the originating service center. The freight is then loaded into trailers and transferred to the destination service center providing service to the delivery area. From the destination service center, the freight is delivered to the customer. Typically, LTL shipments weigh between 150 and 25,000 pounds. In 2008, Con-way Freight’s average weight per shipment was 1,190 pounds.

Network Re-Engineering

Following the integration of the four regional component companies of Con-way Freight into a consolidated single network in 2007, the firm completed a major network re-engineering to improve service, without changing Con-way Freight’s service coverage.

NTDC Standings

Con-way Freight has always had a strong presence at the National Truck Driving Championships. In 2010 the company sent a record 92 drivers to the competition and for the past two years Con-way Freight took home the title of Grand Champion. In 2009 Dale Duncan was named Grand Champion while in 2010 Carl Krites took home the title. Chris Poynor also won the National championships competing in the Twins Division in 2016 and in 2017.

To qualify for U.S. state and national competitions, drivers must have maintained an accident-free driving record for the previous year. At the national competition, drivers face testing in three areas: a timed written exam, a pre-trip inspection test and a driving skills test. Each driver competes in one of nine equipment classes: 3-Axle, 4-Axle, 5-Axle, 5-Axle Flatbed, 5-Axle Sleeper, Step Van, Straight Truck, Tankers and Twins.

External links
 Con-way Freight's official website

References

Trucking companies of the United States
Companies based in Ann Arbor, Michigan
2015 mergers and acquisitions
Transport companies established in 1983
1983 establishments in Michigan
Transportation companies based in Michigan